He is an Irish experimental film directed by Rouzbeh Rashidi, starring James Devereaux as the main character. The film is about a troubling and mysterious portrait of a suicidal man. Rashidi juxtaposes the lead character's apparently revealing monologues with scenes and images that layer the film with ambiguity. The film was funded by Arts Council of Ireland.

References

External links
 

HE on Mubi (website)

2012 films
2010s avant-garde and experimental films
Films set in Ireland
Irish avant-garde and experimental films
English-language Irish films
2010s English-language films